An acute hemolytic transfusion reaction (AHTR), also called immediate hemolytic transfusion reaction, is a life-threatening reaction to receiving a blood transfusion. AHTRs occur within 24 hours of the transfusion and can be triggered by a few milliliters of blood. The reaction is triggered by host antibodies destroying donor red blood cells. AHTR typically occurs when there is an ABO blood group incompatibility, and is most severe when type A donor blood is given to a type O recipient.

Signs and symptoms
Early acute hemolytic transfusion reactions are typically characterized by fever, which may be accompanied by rigors (chills). Mild cases are also typically characterized by abdominal, back, flank, or chest pain. More severe cases may be characterized by shortness of breath, low blood pressure, hemoglobinuria, and may progress to shock and disseminated intravascular coagulation. In anesthetized or unconscious patients, hematuria (blood in the urine) may be the first sign of AHTR. Other symptoms include nausea, vomiting, and wheezing.

Causes
The most common cause of acute hemolytic transfusion reaction is ABO incompatibility, which is typically due to human error that results in a recipient receiving the incorrect blood product. Rarely, other blood type incompatibilities can cause AHTR, the most common of which is Kidd antigen incompatibility. Rh, Kell, and Duffy antigen incompatibility have also been implicated in AHTR.

Mechanism
Antibodies against A and B blood groups (isohemagglutinins) present in the recipient's blood destroy the donor red blood cells. They also activate the coagulation cascade (blood clotting system) via factor XII, which can lead to disseminated intravascular coagulation and kidney damage. Isohemagglutinins also activate the complement cascade via C3a and C5a, which then promote inflammatory cytokine release from white blood cells. These inflammatory cytokines include IL-1, IL-6, IL-8, and TNF-alpha, which cause symptoms of low blood pressure, fever, chest pain, nausea, vomiting, and wheezing.

Diagnosis
The diagnosis of AHTR is made with microscopic examination of the recipient's blood and a direct antiglobulin test. The donor and recipient blood can be re-tested with a type, crossmatch, and antibody screen to determine the cause of the reaction.

Treatment
Initial treatment for any type of transfusion reaction, including AHTR, is discontinuation of the transfusion. Fluid replacement and close monitoring of vital signs are important. People with AHTR are managed with supportive care, which may include diuretics, blood pressure support, and treatment of disseminated intravascular coagulation (with fresh frozen plasma, cryoprecipitate, and platelet transfusion). Furosemide is the diuretic of choice in treatment of AHTR with decreased urine output, because it increases the amount of blood that reaches the renal cortex. Mannitol may also be used. Dopamine is used for blood pressure support because it causes vasodilation (dilation of blood vessels) in the kidneys as well as increasing the cardiac output (amount of blood pumped by the heart each minute).

Prognosis
The severity and prognosis of acute hemolytic transfusion depends on the rate of blood administration and the total volume of the transfusion. Approximately 2% of cases are fatal. Reactions that begin sooner are typically more severe.

Epidemiology
Acute hemolytic transfusion reaction is estimated to occur in 1 in 38,000 to 1 in 70,000 transfusions. An estimated 41% of ABO-incompatible transfusions result in AHTR.

References

Transfusion reactions
Complications of surgical and medical care
Transfusion medicine